Margit Schreib (born 20 January 1967) is a former synchronized swimmer from Germany.

References 

1967 births
Living people
German synchronized swimmers
Olympic synchronized swimmers of Germany
Synchronized swimmers at the 1992 Summer Olympics